Roger Duchêne (3 February 1930 – 25 April 2006) was a French biographer specializing in the letters of Madame de Sévigné.

Duchêne became a member of l'Académie de Marseille in 1972, and received the Grand Prize of l'Académie du Vaucluse en 1980, as well as the Prix du Roi René, le Grand Prix littéraire de Provence in 1983, and received the George Castex l'Académie des Sciences Morales et Politiques Prize and the Grand Prize for Literary Biography from the Académie Française, of which he had already been named laureate for his works published in 1979, 1983 et 1991.

He lived in Marseille, until his death in 2006, aged 75.

Duchêne's works include:
 
 Madame de Sévigné, ou, la chance d'être femme 
 Chère Madame de Sévigné..., coll. "Découvertes Gallimard" (nº 253)
 
 Madame de Sévigné et la lettre d'amour
 Naissances d'un écrivain: Madame de Sévigné
 L'Impossible Marcel Proust
 La Fontaine
 Molière
 Ninon de Lenclos, ou, La manière jolie de faire l'amour 
 Madame de La Fayette
 Marseille
 Etre femme au temps de Louis XIV 
 Les précieuses, ou, Comment l'esprit vint aux femmes  
 Mon Dix-septième siècle: de Mme de Sévigné à Marcel Proust

External links
 Web17 – In Memoriam Roger Duchêne

1930 births
2006 deaths
French biographers
French literary critics
20th-century French writers
20th-century biographers
20th-century French male writers
French male non-fiction writers